Tycoon is a 1947 American Technicolor romance film directed by Richard Wallace and starring John Wayne. It is based on the 1934 novel of the same name by C.E. Scoggins.

Plot
Johnny Munroe (John Wayne) travels to South America to build a mountain railroad tunnel for Frederick Alexander (Sir Cedric Hardwicke), a wealthy industrialist. Complications arise when Alexander insists upon a shorter, more dangerous passage and when his daughter Maura (Laraine Day) develops a romantic interest with Johnny.

Cast
 John Wayne as Johnny Munroe
 Laraine Day as Maura Alexander Munroe
 Sir Cedric Hardwicke as Frederick Alexander
 Judith Anderson as Miss Braithwaite
 James Gleason as Pop Mathews
 Anthony Quinn as Ricky Vegas
 Grant Withers as Fog Harris
 Paul Fix as Joe
 Fernando Alvarado as Chico
 Harry Woods as Holden
 Michael Harvey as Curly Messenger
 Charles Trowbridge as Señor Tobar
 Martin Garralaga as Chávez

Production
Maureen O'Hara was originally cast as Wayne's leading lady, but RKO put her in Sinbad the Sailor instead. Set in the Andes, the film was originally intended to be filmed at RKO's Estudios Churubusco in Mexico but at the last minute production was shifted to Lone Pine, California.

Reception
Though successful, the film did not earn back its huge production costs of RKO's most expensive production up to that time. It ended up losing $1,035,000.

See also
 John Wayne filmography

References

External links
 
 
 
 

1947 films
1947 romantic drama films
1940s adventure drama films
American adventure drama films
American romantic drama films
Films directed by Richard Wallace
Films set in Peru
RKO Pictures films
Films scored by Leigh Harline
1940s English-language films
1940s American films